Fresh Start Fever is a song by English rock band You Me At Six, released on 3 December 2013 as the second single from their fourth album, Cavalier Youth (2014).

In an interview with Kerrang!, vocalist Josh Franceschi explained, "When we started writing in the cottage we rented in Henley, Oxfordshire, we discussed how the album didn't yet have a song that represented what our band had been about until that point. We wanted to write a big pop-rock song, with exaggerated verses and a jump-up-and-down chorus." He further said, "Neal Avron brought all of his expertise of programmed drums and strings and horns, which gave the song a more layered texture. There is a group chant thing in the verse as well that was inspired more by hip-hop artists that we were listening to at the time."

"Fresh Start Fever" received the Kerrang! Award for Best Single.

Personnel
You Me at Six
 Josh Franceschi – lead vocals
 Chris Miller – lead guitar
 Max Helyer – rhythm guitar
 Matt Barnes – bass guitar, percussion
 Dan Flint – drums, percussion

References

  

2013 singles
You Me at Six songs
2013 songs
Virgin Records singles
Song recordings produced by Neal Avron
Songs written by Josh Franceschi